During the 1934–35 season Foot-Ball Club Juventus competed in Serie A and the Mitropa Cup.

Summary 
The club won their fifth title in a row, a unique achievement only surpassed in 2017 by the same Juventus. In December 1934 coach Carcano was suddenly removed from the Juventus club in order to stifle a homosexual scandal in which he was implicated by elements of society hostile to him. Bigatto returned to Juventus in a managerial role during the latter part of the season with the club winning the league over Inter by two points; Virginio Rosetta then took over the team in June.

Squad

Competitions

Serie A

League table

Matches

Mitropa Cup

Eightfinals

Quarterfinals

Semifinals

Statistics

Squad statistics

Players statistics

Appearances

References

Bibliography 

La Stampa, years 1938 and 1939.

External links
 
 

Juventus F.C. seasons
Juventus
Italian football championship-winning seasons